The London Turkish Gazette is a newspaper based in London, UK, serving London's Turkish, Kurdish and Turkish-Cypriot communities (see also: British Turks). It is a bilingual newspaper published in both Turkish and English and is published weekly on Thursdays. It has a circulation of 39,000.

References

External links 
 

London newspapers
Turkish-language newspapers
Bilingual newspapers
Newspapers published in London